The National Pork Producers Council is a trade association representing U.S. pork producers and other industry stakeholders. It lobbies on behalf of its affiliated state associations from its headquarters in Des Moines, Iowa.

History
The National Pork Producers Council was formed in 1954 as a 501(c)(3) charitable organization.  In 1970, it established itself as a 501(c)(5), a trade association which is allowed to lobby, unlike the previous designation of charitable organization.  On January 1, 1986, it became the national-level recipient of pork checkoff funds.

Political involvement 

According to NPPC's website, its mission is to "fight for legislation and regulations, develop revenue and market opportunities and protect the livelihoods of America’s more than 60,000 pork producers. Public policy priority issues include those relating to animal health and food safety, environment and energy, and international trade." It conducts public policy outreach on behalf of its 42 affiliated state associations.

Beyond legislation and regulation, NPPC is involved in the political process through a political action committee, PorkPAC. The PAC seeks to educate the public and support candidates at the state and federal levels who support the industry.

Pig housing

The NPPC supports a variety of housing systems, including gestation crates and open pen housing, each of which has advantages and disadvantages concerning animal welfare, according to the American Veterinary Medical Association.

The Humane Society of the United States and other animal welfare groups have criticized NPPC's support for allowing hog farmers the right to determine the type of housing that's best for their sows.

NPPC petitioned the Supreme Court of the United States to overturn California's animal protection law Proposition 12, in National Pork Producers Council v. Ross.

Environmental risk disclosure 

The NPPC was responsible for the EPA's rollback on disclosing information on factory farms. In 1999 and 2000, the EPA collected data about water and air quality, and other environmental risks surrounding pig farms. The NPPC sued the EPA to keep information about factory hog farms unavailable from FOIA requests and won.

Organization 

NPPC is governed by Board of Directors, composed of 15 members, and pork producer delegates from the organizations' state associations. Recommendations for new policies and for changes to existing policies are considered annually, in March, at the National Pork Industry Forum.

NPPC also creates ad hoc task forces to study or provide guidance on industry issues. NPPC receives advice and works closely with the meat-packing industry and animal health and feed companies, as well as the National Pork Board. Together, NPPC and NPB have formed joint task forces on certain issues.

References 

Agricultural organizations based in the United States
United States Department of Agriculture programs
Marketing boards
Commodity checkoff programs
Agricultural marketing in the United States